Pethaino gia sena  (I Die for You in English) is a 2009 Greek comedy film directed by Nikos Karapanagiotis and written by Eleni Rantou and Philipos Desilas.

Plot
Through the different erotic stories of various characters, the film searches for the different types of bonds in a middle-class modern Greek family, its hopes, expectations, problems and everyday paranoia that its members encounter.

Casting
Eleni Rantou as Zoi
Fanis Mouratidis as Loukas
Sifis Polizoidis as Apostolis
Mihalis Iatropoulos as Babis
Nektarios Loukianos as Vaggelis

References

External links
Review blog:

External links

Greek comedy films
2009 films